Ralph Gerald Backstrom (September 18, 1937 – February 7, 2021) was a Canadian professional ice hockey centre and later a coach, entrepreneur and hockey executive. He played in the National Hockey League with the Montreal Canadiens, Los Angeles Kings, and Chicago Black Hawks between 1956 and 1973. He also played in the World Hockey Association with the Chicago Cougars, Denver Spurs/Ottawa Civics, and New England Whalers from 1973 to 1977. With the Canadiens, he won the Stanley Cup six times, and won the Calder Memorial Trophy as the NHL's rookie of the year in 1959. After retiring he served as head coach of the University of Denver Pioneers for several years in the 1980s.

Playing career
Backstrom played junior hockey from 1954 to 1958, with the Montreal Junior Canadiens, which relocated and was renamed the Ottawa-Hull Canadiens in 1956. He was captain of the team that won the George Richardson Memorial Trophy in 1957 and the Memorial Cup in 1958.

As a professional, Backstrom joined the Montreal Canadiens for the 1958–59 season and was selected the NHL's top rookie, receiving the Calder Memorial Trophy. He played in Montreal for 12 full seasons, winning six Stanley Cups and appearing in six National Hockey League All-Star Games (1958, 1959, 1960, 1962, 1965, 1967). After the 1969–70 season, Backstrom requested a trade and talked about retiring. He reported to training camp, but left the team just before the season opened. After returning to the Canadiens, Backstrom spent most of his time on the bench until being traded to the Los Angeles Kings in January 1971. Just over two years later, he was traded to the Chicago Black Hawks for Dan Maloney and finished the 1972–73 season there.

Backstrom then jumped to the World Hockey Association and joined the Chicago Cougars, where he played for two years, and later became a part-owner of the team. In his first season, he led the Cougars in scoring with 33 goals and 83 points in 70 games. He also represented Canada at the 1974 Summit Series on an all-star team of Canadian WHA players. His offensive production dropped sharply in 1974–75 and at the end of the season the new Denver Spurs selected Backstrom in the WHA's expansion draft. Backstrom was the team's top scorer, but the franchise struggled, and a move to Ottawa—where the team was renamed the Ottawa Civics—did not help. The franchise ceased operations 41 games into the season. Backstrom finished the season with the New England Whalers, scoring 35 goals and 83 points over the year. He played one more year with New England and retired in 1977. He would have turned 40 before the start of the next season. Through his professional career, Backstrom had seven 20-goal seasons in the NHL and two 30-goal seasons in the WHA.

Coaching
Immediately after his retirement Backstrom accepted an offer to join the staff of newly appointed University of Denver head coach Marshall Johnston as an assistant. Three years later Backstrom returned to the NHL as an assistant for the Los Angeles Kings but only stayed for one season before rejoining Denver, this time as the bench boss after Johnston left to join the NHL's Colorado Rockies. Backstrom led the Pioneers through a few lean years in the early 1980s before having a breakout season in 1985–86 when he led Denver to a team record 34-win season, including a conference regular season title, a conference tournament title (their first in 13 years) and reached the team's first Frozen Four since finishing second in 1973.  Backstrom earned the Spencer Penrose Award, as national coach of the year, for the impressive season.  However, the team was unable to sustain the high level of play for the remainder of his tenure. Backstrom resigned after the 1989–90 season, turning the team over to Frank Serratore.

Backstrom jumped into the professional ranks in 1990–91 when he took over the Phoenix Roadrunners. After a good first season, including pushing the number-one seeded Peoria Rivermen to a seventh game in the Turner Cup semifinals, Phoenix dropped to dead last in the 10-team league.  Backstrom subsequently resigned as coach.

Front office
Backstrom, along with Dennis Murphy and Larry King, founded Roller Hockey International and served as commissioner for a time. It soon became apparent that the league was in financial trouble and it suspended the entire 1998 season before playing one final campaign in 1999. While the league did not officially disband until 2001, Backstrom returned to the NHL in 1999–00 as a scout for the St. Louis Blues.

After three seasons with the Blues, Backstrom founded a new CHL team called the Colorado Eagles in 2002. He owned the team, was general manager and president for the first three seasons, including a CHL championship in 2004–05. His Eagles finished atop their division six times, made the finals five times, and won the Ray Miron President's Cup twice in eight seasons before moving to the ECHL in 2011–12.

Awards and achievements

Memorial Cup champion — 1958
Calder Memorial Trophy — 1959
NHL All-Star Games — 1958, 1959, 1960, 1962, 1965, 1967
Stanley Cup champion — 1959, 1960, 1965, 1966, 1968, 1969 (with Montreal)
Paul Deneau Trophy — 1974

Personal life 
Backstrom's parents were both born near Vaasa in Finland, and met in Kirkland Lake, Ontario. He was a cousin of NHL player Daren Puppa.  He was not related to goalie Niklas Bäckström, nor centre Nicklas Bäckström.

Backstrom married his first wife, Frances Richard, in April 1961.  He married his second wife, Janet, in 1985.  They remained married until his death.  He had three children: Martin, Diana, and Andrew.

Backstrom died after a long illness on February 7, 2021, aged 83, in his Windsor, Colorado, home. Backstrom's brain was donated for study to researchers at Boston University and it was found that Backstrom had been suffering from stage 3 chronic traumatic encephalopathy at the time of his death.

Career statistics
Source:

Regular season and playoffs

International

Head coaching record

Source:

See also
List of NHL players with 1,000 games played

References

External links
 

1937 births
2021 deaths
Calder Trophy winners
Canadian ice hockey centres
Canadian people of Finnish descent
Canadian ice hockey coaches
Chicago Blackhawks players
Chicago Cougars players
Colorado Rockies (NHL) announcers
Denver Pioneers men's ice hockey coaches
Denver Spurs (WHA) players
Ice hockey people from Ontario
Los Angeles Kings coaches
Los Angeles Kings players
Montreal Canadiens players
Montreal Junior Canadiens players
New England Whalers players
Ottawa Civics players
Rochester Americans players
St. Louis Blues scouts
Stanley Cup champions
Sportspeople from Kirkland Lake
20th-century Canadian people
21st-century Canadian people